In Greek mythology, the name Cydon (Ancient Greek: Κύδων) may refer to:

Cydon of Crete, eponym of Cydonia. According to one version, he was a son of Tegeates and possibly, Maera, daughter of the Titan Atlas. He was the brother of Leimon, Schephrus, Gortys and Archedius: the three brothers were said to have migrated to Crete from Arcadia. Alternately, Cydon was a native of Crete, son of Acacallis by Hermes or Apollo. He is probably the same as Cydon, the father of Eulimene.
Cydon of Thebes, name shared by three defenders of Thebes in the war of the Seven against Thebes:
One of the fifty warriors who laid an ambush against Tydeus and were killed by him.
Son of Abas, was killed by Parthenopaeus.
Another Theban, killed by Hippomedon.
Cydon of Lemnos, half-brother of Hypsipyle. Was slain by Myrmidone the night all Lemnian men were killed by their women.
Cydon, an ally of Turnus, lover of Clytius. Clytius fell in the battle against Aeneas.
Cydon, one of the horses of Hippodamus.

Notes

References 

 Parthenius, Love Romances translated by Sir Stephen Gaselee (1882-1943), S. Loeb Classical Library Volume 69. Cambridge, MA. Harvard University Press. 1916.  Online version at the Topos Text Project.
 Parthenius, Erotici Scriptores Graeci, Vol. 1. Rudolf Hercher. in aedibus B. G. Teubneri. Leipzig. 1858. Greek text available at the Perseus Digital Library.
 Pausanias, Description of Greece with an English Translation by W.H.S. Jones, Litt.D., and H.A. Ormerod, M.A., in 4 Volumes. Cambridge, MA, Harvard University Press; London, William Heinemann Ltd. 1918. . Online version at the Perseus Digital Library
 Pausanias, Graeciae Descriptio. 3 vols. Leipzig, Teubner. 1903.  Greek text available at the Perseus Digital Library.
 Publius Vergilius Maro, Aeneid. Theodore C. Williams. trans. Boston. Houghton Mifflin Co. 1910. Online version at the Perseus Digital Library.
 Publius Vergilius Maro, Bucolics, Aeneid, and Georgics. J. B. Greenough. Boston. Ginn & Co. 1900. Latin text available at the Perseus Digital Library.
 Stephanus of Byzantium, Stephani Byzantii Ethnicorum quae supersunt, edited by August Meineike (1790-1870), published 1849. A few entries from this important ancient handbook of place names have been translated by Brady Kiesling. Online version at the Topos Text Project.

Princes in Greek mythology
Children of Hermes
Mortal parents of demigods in classical mythology
Characters in the Aeneid
Theban characters in Greek mythology
Cretan characters in Greek mythology
Arcadian mythology
Tegea